Günter Bartusch (April 13, 1943 – July 8, 1971) was a Grand Prix motorcycle road racer from the former East Germany. His best year was in 1970 when he rode for the MZ factory racing team to finish the season in eighth place in the 350cc world championship. Bartusch was killed during practice for the 1971 East German Grand Prix at the Sachsenring.

References 

1933 births
1971 deaths
German motorcycle racers
125cc World Championship riders
250cc World Championship riders
350cc World Championship riders
Isle of Man TT riders
Motorcycle racers who died while racing
Sport deaths in Germany
Sportspeople from Freiberg
People from Bezirk Karl-Marx-Stadt